Frederick Herbert may refer to:
Frederick Herbert (jockey) (1887–1956), Canadian jockey, won the Kentucky Derby
Fred Herbert (1887–1963), baseball player
Frederick Herbert, composer for the TV series Wagon Train
Frederick Herbert, character in Actor's and Sin
Fred Herbert, Bail Bondssh

See also